The Wilbur Cross Highway is the designation for a highway beginning at Wethersfield, running along a portion of Connecticut Route 15 and U.S. Route 5 to East Hartford, Connecticut, and then continuing northeast as a section of Interstate 84, part of which is also cosigned as U.S. Route 6. The highway ends at a junction with the tolled Massachusetts Turnpike in Sturbridge, Massachusetts. The entire route was formerly signed as Route 15.

Route description

Route 15 and U.S. Route 5
The Wilbur Cross Highway begins as a Y-interchange with the Berlin Turnpike in Wethersfield. South of here, Route 15 and U.S. Route 5 (US 5) continue south along the turnpike. The highway proceeds in a northeasterly direction and has an interchange with Route 99 (Old Route 9) before entering Hartford and reaching interchanges with Interstate 91 (I-91) and the Hartford–Brainard Airport access road. The highway then crosses the Connecticut River by way of the Charter Oak Bridge, curving to a more east-west direction, before merging into the median of I-84 in East Hartford.

Interstate 84

US 6 is cosigned with I-84 on the Wilbur Cross Highway from exit 57 in East Hartford to exit 60 in Manchester.

History

The highway was built in the 1940s, before the Interstate Highway era, as a continuation of the Wilbur Cross Parkway, which itself is a continuation of the Merritt Parkway – all of which were once signed Route 15. Originally, the parkways were to span continuously from Greenwich to Union, but with the opening of Interstate 91, the planned segment between Meriden and Hartford was never built, and Route 15 was instead routed along the Berlin Turnpike.

In 1958, the highway north of the Charter Oak Bridge was cosigned as I-84, as part of the interstate highway's planned route through Connecticut. In 1968, this designation was moved to a proposed highway from Hartford to Providence, and the then-cosigned portion with Route 15 was renumbered to I-86. The Route 15 designation remained cosigned with I-86 section south of the Massachusetts border until October 1, 1980, when it was truncated to its current northern terminus at exit 57 of I-84. The I-84 designation was restored in 1984 when the planned highway to Providence was cancelled.

From 1948 to 1982, US 44 was signed along the highway from current exit 60 to current exit 69.

Charter Oak Bridge
The Charter Oak Bridge, which carries the highway across the Connecticut River, has been operational since 1942. Due to the bridge's failing condition and the clogging on the nearby Bissell and Founders Bridges in the late 1980s, the Charter Oak Bridge and approach was completely rebuilt in 1991 to its current form.

Exit list
Exit numbers correspond to those of Route 15 and Interstate 84. Old exit numbers correspond to when the I-84 was signed as Route 15.

References

State highways in Connecticut
Interstate 84 (Pennsylvania–Massachusetts)
Transportation in Hartford County, Connecticut